Orazio Comes (11 November 1848 – 13 October 1917) was an Italian botanist.

From 1906 to 1917 he directed the Agricultural Higher Institute of Portici, in which, thanks to Vincenzo de Cesati, he began teaching since 1877 as assistant of Nicola Pedicino for the chair of botany, to whom he succeeded in 1880.

In his works he studied the physiology and plant pathology of Neapolitan mushrooms and agricultural plants, such as beans and tobacco. From 1881, Comes began to deal with the cultivation of tobacco to improve industrial production and, starting from 1891, he emphasized the study and experimentation in that sector.

In 1958 the museum of the botanical institute of Portici, hosted in the Royal Palace, was named after him.

He is honoured in the name of Comesia, a genus of fungi in the Helotiales order, circumscribed in 1884.

References

External links 
 Museo Botanico Orazio Comes, Università degli studi di Napoli Federico II

1848 births
1917 deaths
19th-century Italian botanists
20th-century Italian botanists